This is a list of aviation-related events from 1958.

Deadliest crash
The deadliest crash of this year was KLM Flight 607-E, a Lockheed Super Constellation which crashed into the Atlantic Ocean west of Galway, Ireland on 14 August, killing all 99 people on board.

Events 
 For the first time, the total of transatlantic passengers carried by air this year exceeds the total carried by sea.
 Gulfstream Aerospace is founded in Savannah, Georgia, in the United States.
 The Argentine Navy acquires its first aircraft carrier by purchasing HMS Warrior from the United Kingdom.
 The Brazilian Navy acquires aircraft of its own for the first time since the 1941 creation of the Brazilian Air Force, purchasing two Bell 47-J and three Westland Widgeon helicopters.

January 
 January 1
During a revolt against Venezuelan President Marcos Pérez Jiménez, rebel Venezuelan Air Force de Havilland Venom, de Havilland Vampire, and F-86 Sabre aircraft attack Miraflores Palace, the defense ministry, and other military targets in the Caracas area.
As a cost-saving measure, the United States Air Force inactivates the Eighteenth Air Force and reassigns its forces to the Twelfth Air Force.
 January 14 – Qantas becomes the first foreign airline permitted to fly across the United States.
 January 26 – British European Airways (BEA) takes over all operation of Cyprus Airways routes, although Cyprus Airways continues to operate under its own name.
January 31 – While a U.S. Air Force Boeing B-47 Stratojet makes a simulated takeoff in Morocco, a wheel casting failure causes its tail assembly to strike the runway. One of the bomber's fuel tanks ruptures, and a fire breaks out that damages an armed nuclear bomb aboard the aircraft, releasing some radioactive material into the environment.

February 
 February 1 – United Airlines sets a record commercial Honolulu, Hawaii-to-Los Angeles, California, flight time of 6 hours 21 minutes.
 February 5 – Two United States Air Force aircraft – a B-47B Stratojet and an F-86 Sabre – collide in mid-air over the Atlantic Ocean off the coast of Georgia in the United States. The F-86 crashes after its pilot ejects, but the B-47B remains airborne, jettisons a Mark 15 hydrogen bomb into Wassaw Sound off Tybee Island, Georgia, and makes an emergency landing at Hunter Army Airfield in Savannah, Georgia. The bomb has not been recovered.
 February 6 – The British European Airways Airspeed Ambassador G-ALZU Lord Burghley, operating as Flight 609, crashes on its third attempt to take off from a slush-covered runway at Munich-Riem Airport in West Germany, killing 23, including eight Manchester United footballers.
 February 11 – Mohawk Airlines hires Ruth Carol Taylor as the first African American flight attendant in history. Six months later, Mohawk will fire her for getting married, a common airline industry practice at the time.
 February 13 – A British Ministry of Defence White Paper makes Britain's nuclear weapons programme public knowledge.
 February 16 – Eight hijackers commandeer a Korean National Airlines Douglas DC-3 with 34 people on board during a domestic flight in South Korea from Busan to Seoul and force it to fly to Pyongyang, North Korea.
 February 25 – United Airlines sets a record commercial Honolulu, Hawaii-to-San Francisco, California, flight time of 5 hours 43 minutes.
 February 27 – The Silver City Airways Bristol 170 Freighter G-AICS, travelling from Ronaldsway Airport, Ballasalla, on the Isle of Man to Ringway Airport in Manchester, England, crashes into Winter Hill, Rivington Moor, Lancashire, in North West England in bad weather, killing 35 of the 42 people on board and injuring all seven survivors.

March 
 South Vietnams Republic of Vietnam Air Force takes delivery of its first helicopters.
 Misrair, the future EgyptAir, renames itself United Arab Airlines. Egypt's and Syria's merger on 1 February to form the United Arab Republic prompts the name change.
The bomb smashes the closed bomb bay doors open and strikes the ground in Mars Bluff, South Carolina. The bomb's core is not in the weapon, so no nuclear explosion occurs.
 March 16 – Air Inter commences operations.
 March 22 – Lucky Liz, the private twin-engine Lockheed Lodestar of American theater and film producer Mike Todd, flying grossly overloaded in fog, snow, and thunderstorms, crashes in the Zuni Mountains near Grants, New Mexico, when one of its engines fails in icing conditions. All four people aboard the plane die, including Todd and his biographer, the American sportswriter, screenwriter, and author Art Cohn. Todd's wife, American actress Elizabeth Taylor, is not aboard because she had stayed home with a bout of bronchitis.

April 
 The Handley Page Victor strategic bomber begins to enter squadron service with the Royal Air Force.
 April 6 – Vickers Viscount N7437, operating as Capital Airlines Flight 67, stalls and crashes into Saginaw Bay near Freeland, Michigan, while on approach to Freeland-Tri City Airport in Saginaw, Michigan. All 47 people aboard die. The cause is attributed to ice accretion on the horizontal stabilizer.
 April 9 – A Cubana de Aviación Vickers Viscount with 13 people on board is hijacked during a domestic flight in Cuba from Havana to Santa Clara and forced to fly to Mérida, Mexico.
 April 10 – A rebellious Republic of Korea Air Force (ROKAF) captain attempts to hijack a ROKAF Curtiss C-46 Commando with seven people on board during a domestic flight in South Korea from Daegu to Seoul and force it to fly him to North Korea. A struggle ensures in which the hijacker shoots one of the crew members to death, but he is subdued and the plane diverts to a landing at Pyongtaek, South Korea.
 April 13 – The three crew members of a Cubana de Aviación Douglas DC-3 with 12 passengers on board making a domestic flight in Cuba from Havana to Santa Clara illegally fly the airliner to Miami, Florida, instead to seek refuge in the United States.
All 47 persons aboard the airliner and both F-100 crew members are killed.
 April 28
 A B-26 Invader bomber flown by U.S. Central Intelligence Agency employee William H. Beale in support of Indonesian Permesta rebels bombs the harbor at Balikpapan, Borneo, Indonesia, sinking the British oil tanker  and hitting the British oil tanker  with a  bomb that bounces overboard without exploding. In June, the Indonesian and British governments both will claim that Indonesian rebels flew the bomber, concealing the CIA's involvement.
 Aerlínte Éireann, a division of Aer Lingus, makes the first transatlantic flight by an Irish airline, using a Lockheed L-1049 Super Constellation for a flight from Shannon to New York City.

May 
 May 17 – Four F3H Demons and four F8U Crusaders make a non-stop crossing of the Atlantic Ocean.
 May 18
 Indonesian forces shoot down a B-26 Invader bomber flown by U.S. Central Intelligence Agency employee Allen Pope in support of Indonesian Permesta rebels and capture Pope. In June, the Indonesian and British governments both will claim that Indonesian rebels flew the bomber, concealing the CIA's involvement.
 In a zero-length launch (ZEL) experiment, a U.S. Air Force North American F-100D Super Sabre becomes airborne with no runway or take-off roll at all, using its own engine in afterburner and boosted by a -thrust Astrodyne rocket.
 May 20 – Vickers Viscount N7410 of Capital Airlines collides in mid-air with a Lockheed T-33 Shooting Star of the Air National Guard. All eleven on board the Viscount are killed when it crashes at Brunswick, Maryland, as is one of the two crew members of the T-33.
 May 22–23 – Flying a Douglas F4D-1 Skyray, United States Marine Corps Major N. LeFaivre breaks five world climb-to-height records, including  in 2 minutes 36 seconds.
 May 25 – A Dan-Air Avro 685 York C.1 cargo aircraft suffers an in-flight engine fire and crashes during a forced landing near Gurgaon, Haryana, India, killing four members of the five-person crew.
 May 26 – The Short SC.1 experimental VTOL aircraft makes its first (tethered) vertical flight, in the United Kingdom.

June 
 June 2 – Shortly after takeoff from Guadalajara Airport in Guadalajara, Mexico, for a flight to Mexico City, Aeronaves de México Flight 111, a Lockheed L-749A Constellation (registration XA-MEV), crashes into La Latilla Mountain,  from Guadalajara Airport, killing all 45 people on board in what at the time is the deadliest aviation accident in Mexican history. Two prominent American scientists – oceanographer Townsend Cromwell and fisheries scientist Bell M. Shimada – are among the dead. The post-accident investigation will find that the airliner's crew did not follow the established climb-out procedure for the airport after taking off.
 June 9 – London Gatwick Airport opens after two years of extensive reconstruction. It is the first multimodal airport in the world, with direct rail connections from the main terminal to London and Brighton.
 June 26 – A Grumman TF-1 Trader of U.S. Navy Air Transport Squadron 21 (VR-21) carries a Westinghouse J34 jet engine from San Diego, California, on a 300-mile (483-km) flight to the anti-submarine warfare carrier , then at sea in the Pacific Ocean. It is the first delivery of an aircraft engine via carrier onboard delivery.
 June 28 – The 22-year operational career of the Avro Anson comes to an end with a six-plane formation fly-past over their base by the Southern Communications Squadron at Bovington, Hampshire, in the United Kingdom.

July 
 Royal Air Maroc initiates a number of long-haul routes using four Lockheed L-749 Constellations leased from Air France. The arrival of the Constellations allows the airline to withdraw its Douglas DC-4s from long-haul service.
 July 1 – Royal Nepal Airlines is founded. Initially, its fleet consists of a single Douglas DC-3.
 July 3 – The "Telecopter," a Bell Model 47 rented by television station KTLA in Los Angeles, California, and outfitted with a television camera, makes the worlds first flight by a television news helicopter. Its inventor, John D. Silva, is aboard. When the television station reports that it is receiving no video, Silva exits the helicopters cockpit to climb onto its landing skid while it hovers at  so that he can investigate the microwave transmitter bolted to its side, where he discovers that a vacuum tube has failed due to vibration and hot weather. After Silva fixes the problem overnight, the Telecopter makes its first successful news flight the following day.
 July 15–16 – Aircraft from the United States Navy aircraft carrier  cover United States Army and U.S. Marine Corps landings in Lebanon in Operation Blue Bat, the American intervention in the 1958 Lebanon crisis. Air support begins with a flight by 50 Essex jets over Beirut on July 15.
 July 29 – President Dwight D. Eisenhower signs the National Aeronautics and Space Act, disestablishing the National Advisory Committee on Aeronautics (NACA) and creating the National Aeronautics and Space Administration (NASA), both effective October 1, 1958.

August 
 Pacific Southwest Airlines inaugurates service to Los Angeles International Airport.
 August 9 – Central African Airways Flight 890, a Vickers Viscount airliner, crashes near Benina International Airport outside Benghazi, Libya, killing 36 of the 54 people on board. It is the deadliest aviation accident in Libyan history at the time.
Six members of Egypt's national fencing team are among the dead.
 August 23
The Second Taiwan Strait Crisis begins with People's Republic of China artillery shelling the Nationalist Chinese-held islands of Quemoy and Matsu. During the crisis, the U.S. Navy attack aircraft carriers  and  patrol nearby, and F8U Crusader fighters from them make 1,000-knot (1,150-mph; 1,852-km/hr) sweeps along the coast of China.
President Dwight D. Eisenhower signs the Federal Aviation Act of 1958, dissolving the Civil Aeronautics Administration and Civil Aeronautics Board and transferring all authority over aviation operations in the United States to the newly created Federal Aviation Agency (FAA, later renamed Federal Aviation Administration).

September 
 September 2 – An Independent Air Travel Vickers VC.1 Viking cargo aircraft carrying a cargo of two Bristol Proteus turboprop engines suffers engine trouble soon after takeoff from London Heathrow Airport. While attempting to reach Blackbushe Airport for an emergency landing, the Viking crashes into a row of houses in Southall, London, England, killing its entire crew of three and a mother and three children on the ground.
 September 5 – One or more hijackers attempt to commandeer an Aeroflot Ilyushin Il-14P with 17 people on board during a domestic flight in the Soviet Union from Leningrad to Tallinn. Passengers overpower the hijacker or hijackers, one person dies in the struggle, and the airliner diverts to a landing at Jõhvi.
 September 6 – The U.S. Joint Chiefs of Staff recommend that U.S. Navy forces be given permission for more aggressive action the Second Taiwan Strait Crisis, including carrier air strikes against the territory of the People's Republic of China, but President Dwight D. Eisenhower rejects the idea.
 September 18 – East Germany establishes the airline Interflug as a hedge against its national airline, Deutsche Lufthansa (DLH), losing a trademark lawsuit to the West German airline Lufthansa, which in August 1954 had purchased the right to use the name of the defunct pre-1945 German airline Deutsche Luft Hansa. Pending legal developments, Interflug operates as a charter airline until taking over DLH's assets upon the liquidation of DLH in September 1963.
 September 20 – During a high-speed flyby in an air show at RAF Syerston, Nottinghamshire, England, prototype Avro Vulcan bomber (serial number VX770) suffers total collapse of the starboard wing and crashes, killing its entire crew and three people on the ground.
 September 24 – During the Second Taiwan Strait Crisis, a dogfight breaks out between 32 Republic of China Air Force F-86F Sabres and over 100 Peoples Republic of China MiG aircraft. During the engagement, guided air-to-air missiles are employed in combat for the first time when the Sabres use AAM-N-7 Sidewinder IA – later known as AIM-9B Sidewinder IA – missiles to down several MiG-15 (NATO reporting name "Fagot") fighters and at least ten MiG-17s (NATO reporting name "Fresco").
 September 30 – Britain's last flying boat is withdrawn from commercial service when Aquila Airways terminates its service on the Southampton--Funchal (Madeira) route.

October 
 October 1 – In the United States, in accordance with the National Aeronautics and Space Act of 1958, the National Advisory Committee on Aeronautics (NACA) is dissolved and its successor, the National Aeronautics and Space Administration (NASA), begins operations.
 October 4 – BOAC de Havilland Comet 4 G-APDB makes the first commercial transatlantic crossing by a jet airliner, from London Heathrow Airport to New York International Airport, Anderson Field via Gander.
 October 10 – A C-123B Provider serving as a maintenance support aircraft for the United States Air Force Thunderbirds air demonstration team flies into a flock of birds and crashes near Payette, Idaho, killing the entire flight crew of five and all 14 maintenance personnel on board. It remains the worst accident in Thunderbirds history.
 October 15 – The first North American X-15 is rolled out at North American Aviations facility at Los Angeles, California.
 October 19 – A People's Republic of China-owned Tupolev Tu-104 crashes at Kanash in the Soviet Union during a regular flight between Beijing and Moscow, killing all 65 passengers and crew members. Among those killed are 16 Chinese government officials, one Briton, four East Germans and the son of the Cambodian ambassador to China.
 October 22
The Vickers Viscount 701 G-ANHC, operating as British European Airways Flight 142, collides with an Italian Air Force F-86E Sabre over Anzio, Italy. Both aircraft crash; the F-86E pilot ejects and survives, but all 31 people aboard the Viscount die.
 Three rebels hijack a Cubana de Aviación Douglas DC-3 with 14 people on board during a domestic flight in Cuba from Cayo Mambi to Moa and force it land at a rebel-held airfield in the Sierra Maestra mountain range in southeastern Cuba.
 October 25 – The Short SC.1 experimental VTOL aircraft makes its first free vertical flight.
 October 26
Snowy Mountains Scheme worker Tom Sonter accidentally discovers the wreckage of the Australian National Airways Avro 618 Ten Southern Cloud, which had disappeared without trace in bad weather over the Snowy Mountains in New South Wales, Australia, with the loss of all eight people on board on March 21, 1931, in Australias first airline disaster.
The first commercial flight by a Boeing 707 jet airliner takes place, on Pan American World Airways transatlantic service from New York City to Paris.

November 
 Trans-Pacific Airlines changes its name to Aloha Airlines.
 November 4 – Shortly after takeoff from Dyess Air Force Base outside Abilene, Texas, a United States Air Force B-47 Stratojet carrying a nuclear bomb catches fire. It reaches an altitude of  before it crashes, killing one of its four crewmen.
 November 6 – Rebels hijack a Cubana de Aviación Douglas DC-3 with 29 people on board during a domestic flight in Cuba from Manzanillo to Holguín and force it land at a rebel-held airfield in Cuba.
 November 25 – The English Electric P.1B, the first fully developed prototype of the English Electric Lightning, exceeds Mach 2 for the first time.
 November 26 – A U.S. Air Force B-47 Stratojet with a nuclear bomb aboard is destroyed by fire while on the ground at Chennault Air Force Base near Lake Charles, Louisiana. High-explosive material in the bomb detonates, contaminating the bomber's wreckage and the surrounding area with radioactivity, but there is no nuclear explosion.

December 
 An operational Royal Navy fighter squadron fires air-to-air missiles for the first time, when three de Havilland Sea Venoms of No. 893 Squadron, Fleet Air Arm, embarked aboard the aircraft carrier  fire Firestreak missiles at target drones over the Mediterranean Sea off Malta, scoring 80 percent hits.
 December 4 – Flying a Cessna 172 Skyhawk (registration N9172B), Robert Timm and John Cook take off from McCarran Airfield in Las Vegas, Nevada. They will remain airborne continuously for 64 days 22 hours 19 minutes 5 seconds before landing at McCarran Airfield on February 4, 1959, setting a new world record for manned flight endurance.
 December 10 – National Airlines becomes the first airline to offer jet service on domestic flights within the United States, using a Boeing 707 leased from Pan American World Airways for flights between Miami, Florida, and New York City.
 December 18 – The Bell XV-3 Tiltrotor makes the first true mid-air transition from vertical helicopter-type flight to fully level fixed-wing flight.
 December 23 – Syrian Airways merges into United Arab Airlines (the future EgyptAir). United Arab Airlines takes over all of Syrian Airways' routes and aircraft.
 December 24 – During a test flight to renew its certificate of airworthiness, the BOAC Bristol Britannia 312 G-AOVD crashes near Sopley and Winkton, England, killing nine of the 12 people on board and injuring all three survivors.

First flights

January
 January 17– Aviamilano Nibbio
 January 19 – Fuji T-1
January 20 – Nord 3400
 January 25 – Aer Lualdi L.55
January 31 – North American T2J-1, first variant of the T2J Buckeye, redesignated as the T-2 Buckeye in September 1962

February
 February 22 – Auster Workmaster
 February 25 – Doak VZ-4

March
 March 5 – Yakovlev Yak-28
 March 11 – Handley Page Dart Herald
 March 15 – Antonov An-14
 March 25 – Avro CF-105 Arrow RL201 at Malton, Toronto, Ontario, Canada
 March 27 – Aerfer Ariete

April
 April 17 – LIPNUR Belalang
 April 22 – Boeing Vertol 107-II
 April 24 – SIPA S.1100
 April 30 – Blackburn Buccaneer XK 486

May
 May 2 – Kaman K-17
 May 12
Dassault Mirage IIIA
Morane-Saulnier M.S. 1500 Epervier
 May 21 
Dassault Étendard IVM
Breguet 940
PZL-102 Kos
 May 27 – McDonnell XF4H-1, prototype of the F-4 Phantom II
 May 30 – Douglas DC-8

June
 June 2 – Vought XF8U-3 Crusader III, the "Super Crusader"
 June 5 – Sud Aviation SE-116 Voltigeur
 June 9 – Agusta AZ8-L
 June 15 – Westland Westminster
 June 20 – Westland Wessex
 June 26 – PZL M-2

July
 July 4 – SAN Jodel D.140 Mousquetaire
 July 5 – Bristol Belvedere
 July 8 – Borgward Kolibri
 July 20 – Saro P.531
 July 30 – de Havilland Canada DHC-4 Caribou CF-KTK-X

August
 August 14 – Grumman Gulfstream I
 August 28 – Beechcraft Queen Air Model 65
 August 31 – North American A3J-1 Vigilante

September
 September 16 – North American NA265-40 Sabreliner
 September 24
Beijing 1
HAL Pushpak

November
 Adams-Wilson Hobbycopter
 November 6 – Downer Bellanca 260

December
 December 4 – Baade B-152 V1 Prototype
 December 12 – Dornier Do 29
 December 17 – Wassmer WA-30 Bijave
 December 25 – Sukhoi Su-11 (NATO reporting name "Fishpot-C")

Entered service 
 Beriev Be-10 (NATO reporting name "Mallow") with the 2nd Squadron of Soviet Naval Aviation′s 977th Independent Naval Long-range Reconnaissance Air Regiment

January
 January 26 – Lockheed F-104 Starfighter with the United States Air Forces 83rd Fighter Interceptor Squadron at Hamilton Air Force Base, California.

April
 April 9 – Handley Page Victor with the Royal Air Force′s No. 10 Squadron at RAF Cottesmore
 April 21 – Vertol Model 44 with New York Airways

May
 Canadair CL-28 Argus with the Royal Canadian Air Force′s No. 405 Squadron
 May 26 – Republic F-105B Thunderchief with the U.S. Air Force's 335th Tactical Fighter Squadron at Eglin Air Force Base

June
 Supermarine Scimitar with 803 Naval Air Squadron, Fleet Air Arm

August
 Boeing 707 with Pan American World Airways

November
 November 3 – de Havilland Sea Vixen to 700 Naval Air Squadron

December
 Lockheed L-188 Electra with American Airlines

Retirements 
Curtiss P-40, by the Brazilian Air Force

April
 April 16 – Convair R3Y Tradewind by United States Navy Transport Squadron 2 (VR-2)
 April 22 – Westland Wyvern by 813 Naval Air Squadron, Fleet Air Arm, Royal Navy

June
 June 28 – Avro Anson by the Southern Communications Squadron

References

 
 
 

 
Aviation by year